James Shoulder (born 11 September 1946) is an English former football manager and player. Most notably, he was manager of the Australian national team from 1976 to 1978.

As a player, Shoulder spent time at Sunderland, Scarborough and Hartlepool United. He combined his football career with higher education and graduated with a degree in Sociology from Durham University in 1973.

He was manager of the Australian national team from 1976 to 1978, after succeeding Brian Green, who had been charged and convicted of stealing two LP records. After failing to secure Australia's qualification to the 1978 FIFA World Cup in Argentina, Shoulder was sacked, and replaced by Rudi Gutendorf. Later, Shoulder would head the Australian Institute of Sport Football Program, as well as coach the Australia national under-20 football team. Shoulder would also coach throughout Asia, and spent ten years as manager of the Welsh under-21 team. He was the director of football academy Shinzhon Town in China, coach of academy Sheffield Wednesday, the head coach Singapore Armed Forces FC (Singapore) and worked with the academy at FC Pakhtakor.

References

External links
https://web.archive.org/web/20100203035336/http://www.pakhtakor.uz/en/news/article/jimmy-shoulder-best-academy-which-as-much-as-possible-uses-reserves-and-brings-up-stars-from-local/

1946 births
Living people
People from Esh Winning
Footballers from County Durham
English footballers
Association football fullbacks
English Football League players
Sunderland A.F.C. players
Vancouver Royals players
Scarborough F.C. players
United Soccer Association players
Hartlepool United F.C. players
English football managers
Australian Institute of Sport coaches
Australia national soccer team managers
Sheffield Wednesday F.C. non-playing staff
Singapore Premier League head coaches
Warriors FC head coaches
Alumni of St Cuthbert's Society, Durham
English expatriate footballers
English expatriate sportspeople in Canada
Expatriate soccer players in Canada